Harry Howard Dale (December 3, 1868 – November 17, 1935) was an American lawyer and politician who served three terms as a U.S. Representative from New York from 1913 to 1919.

Life
Born in New York City, Dale moved with his parents to Brooklyn in 1870.
He attended the public schools of Brooklyn and New York Law School.
He was admitted to the New York bar May 14, 1891, and commenced practice in Brooklyn, New York.
He was a member of the New York State Assembly (Kings Co., 15th D.) in 1898, 1902, 1903, 1904 and 1905.
He served as attorney for the State comptroller in 1911 and 1912.

Tenure in Congress 
Dale was elected as a Democrat to the Sixty-third, Sixty-fourth, and Sixty-fifth Congresses and served from March 4, 1913, to January 6, 1919, when he resigned having been appointed judge of the magistrate's court in 1919.
Reappointed in 1929 and served from January 7, 1919, to July 21, 1931.

Later career and death 
He was appointed judge for the court of special sessions on July 22, 1931, and served until his death in Bellmore, New York, on November 17, 1935.
He remains were cremated and the ashes deposited in Fresh Pond Road Crematory, Brooklyn, New York.

References

1868 births
1935 deaths
New York Law School alumni
Democratic Party members of the New York State Assembly
Democratic Party members of the United States House of Representatives from New York (state)
New York (state) state court judges